Display Inc., stylized as display, is an online social media and networking service based in Norwalk, Connecticut. The display app officially launched in May 2021.

History 
In September 2019, display (formerly Tsū) announced its planned relaunch. According to Chief Executive Officer John Acunto, display would share ad revenue with users, a 50% payout of ad revenue. display also incorporated protections against spam and empowers users to access data, analytics and insights related to their content. 

In an interview with Fox Business (in response to the October 29th NCAA Board of Governors unanimous vote to allow student-athletes to be paid for the use of their name, image and likeness), Tiki Barber, former NY Giants running back, cited display as a “great platform” to put the new NCAA rules to use, adding that display enables influencers of all kinds to have the ability to monetize their own content and brands.  Barber went on to say that display is creating a platform that gives all users access to brand partnership, by sharing in ad revenue, providing storefronts and more.  display’s John Acunto echoed Barber’s sentiment saying that college athletes were just one example of those who could benefit from display: "I see this as an opportunity for all kinds of categories of people who are influencers [and] who have brands to engage with us."

display rebranded from Tsū in April 2021.

Core pillars 
"display, the ‘Social That Pays’, put the creators on the focus. Our platform revolves around the people who create valuable content. We believe that they deserve the reward for all the efforts they put in."

 Awarding content creators based on the ad revenue they generate on the platform
 Enabling commerce at the point of discovery via a personalized storefront
 Providing tools that inspire content creation and empower creators to post efficiently

displayFest 
Beginning on May 3, 2021, displayFest began. It featured a series of performances including sets from Snoop Dogg, Ice Cube, Fat Joe, Chinese Kitty, Polo G, Saweetie, Moneybagg Yo, YG, Lil Durk and more.

Each weeknight, Sarah Pribis, former host of viral trivia app HQ, led interactive question and answer style games with cash prizes ranging from $10,000 to as much as $100,000.

App features 
Available for iOS and Android devices, main features include:

 Profiles – Similar to other social media sites, a display “Profile” allows the user to upload photos and videos, friend/ follow, post, create a bio and promote personal websites. 
Store - Creators can personally curate a marketplace in an easily created for, enabling purchase at the point of discovery.
 Bank – The display bank allows users to be paid out via Paypal.

 Analytics (“Insights”) – In-app console that provides post engagement data to the user. Shows users what posts performed the best, incentivizing them to post more content that their audience enjoys.
 Live Streaming - Users can live stream from the app to their friends, followers and family. Users can interact with the live streaming creator via a chat function
 display TV – display’s built-in television channel that includes several daily livestream components.  Both the livestream and pre-recorded shows containing educational material, announcements, news and updates, and spotlight and promote Tsū user content through reviews and interviews.
 Communities – Communities are ways for display users to communicate and exchange ideas and plan and promote events.  Communities can be public or private.

References

External links
 
display TV

Social media companies of the United States
Social networking services